Reus is a city and municipality in Catalonia, Spain.

Reus may also refer to:
Reus (surname), a Dutch, German and Catalan surname
Reus al Norte, a historic barrio in Montevideo, Uruguay
Reus (video game), an indie game from Abbey Games
Research Experiences for Undergraduates (REUs)
Actus reus ("guilty act"), a criminal law term

Named after the city Reus
Reus Airport
CF Reus Deportiu, a football club 
Reus Deportiu, a sports club known for its roller hockey team
Reus Imperials, an American football team

See also
Reuss (disambiguation)